The Computer Museum may refer to:

 The Computer Museum, Boston
 The Computer History Museum, in Mountain View, California

See also 
 List of computer museums